Vincentiana is the sixth symphony by the Finnish composer Einojuhani Rautavaara.  In 1986–1987, Rautavaara wrote the opera Vincent based on several events in the life of painter Vincent van Gogh; many of the themes of that opera became the basis of Vincentiana.

20th-century symphonies
Compositions by Einojuhani Rautavaara
Composer tributes (classical music)
Cultural depictions of Vincent van Gogh